St. John's Church, Suzhou is a Protestant church located in Gusu District, Suzhou, Jiangsu, China.

History 
St. John's Church traces its origins to the former East Soochow Methodist Church, founded in 1881 by American missionary Alvin Pierson Parker, a member of the Methodist Episcopal Church, South.

At the beginning of the 20th century, the number of Christians in Suzhou increased. And it was renamed the St. John's Church in memory of the St. John's Church in St. Louis, Missouri, United States for its financial support. Chong-tan Lee, grandfather of Tsung-Dao Lee, served as its first chief pastor.

In 1959, the church was rented by the Suzhou First People's Hospital and returned to the Church in 1995. It was refurbished and redecorated from October 1996 to March 1998. The church was officially reopened to the public in November 2005 with the approval of the Chinese government.

Gallery

References

Further reading 
 

Churches in Suzhou
Tourist attractions in Suzhou
1881 establishments in China
Religious organizations established in 1881
Protestant churches in China
Churches completed in 1915